Pantjawarna (Perfected Spelling: Pancawarna; Indonesian for Five Colours) is a 1941 film from the Dutch East Indies (now Indonesia).

Plot
A young woman must raise her two daughters, despite several hardships, while her husband is in prison. She is ultimately taken in by the nobleman Raden Gatot, and the two fall in love. After she divorces her former husband, she and Gatot are married. Her former husband, however, upon release from prison, decides to challenge Gatot. Later in the film the mother must choose a good suitor for her daughters.

Production
Pantjawarna was produced by Tjho Seng Han and directed by Njoo Cheong Seng for Oriental Film. Njoo had worked for the company since 1940, when he and his wife Fifi Young were signed to produce Kris Mataram.

The film had twelve songs, including works in the kroncong, gambus, and Sundanese styles; for this, it has been called the first musical film in the Dutch East Indies. It starred Young, Mochtar Widjaja, Dhalia, Idris Martha, Omar Rodriga, S Poniman, Siti Aminah, Iyem Cilacap, and Soerip.

Release and reception
Pantjawarna was released by March 1941, and rated for viewers over the age of 13. One reviewer, in the Soerabaijasch Handelsblad, described the film as excellent, with good humour and strong dramatic elements; praise was directed in particular to the film's technical aspects and the performances of Dhalia and Young. Another, in the Bataviaasch Nieuwsblad, praised Young's acting.

It was Njoo's last film for Oriental; he and Young migrated to Majestic Film soon afterwards. Oriental closed later in 1941, after releasing a final film, Panggilan Darah (Call of Blood). This film featured Dhalia and Soerip in starring roles, as orphaned sisters who tried to make a living in the colonial capital of Batavia (now Jakarta), and also featured Poniman and Mochtar Widjaja; Only the last of these left the film industry following Oriental's demise; Dhalia, Soerip, and Poniman remained active for several decades.

The film is likely lost. As elsewhere in the world at the time, movies in the Indies were shot on highly flammable nitrate film, and after a fire destroyed much of Produksi Film Negara's warehouse in 1952, old films shot on nitrate were deliberately destroyed. As such, American visual anthropologist Karl G. Heider suggests that all Indonesian films from before 1950 are lost. However, JB Kristanto's Katalog Film Indonesia (Indonesian Film Catalogue) records several as having survived at Sinematek Indonesia's archives, and film historian Misbach Yusa Biran writes that several Japanese propaganda films have survived at the Netherlands Government Information Service.

References

Works cited

 

 
 
 
 
 
 

Films directed by Njoo Cheong Seng
Oriental Film films
Indonesian black-and-white films